Fereydun (New Persian: , Fereydūn/Farīdūn) is an Iranian mythical king and hero from the Pishdadian dynasty. He is known as an emblem of victory, justice, and generosity in Persian literature.

According to Abolala Soudavar, Fereydun is partially a reflection of Cyrus the Great, the first Achaemenid King of Kings.

Etymology
All of the forms of the name shown above derive, by regular sound laws, from Proto-Iranian *Θraitauna- (Avestan Θraētaona-) and Proto-Indo-Iranian *Traitaunas.

Traitaunas is a derivative (with augmentative suffix -una/-auna) of Tritas, the name of a deity or hero reflected in the Vedic Trita and the Avestan Θrita. Both names are identical to the adjective meaning "the third", a term used of a minor deity associated with two other deities to form a triad. In the Indian Vedas, Trita is associated with thunder gods and wind gods. Trita is also called Āptya, a name that is probably cognate with Āθβiya, the name of Thraetaona's father in the Avestā, Zoroastrian texts collated in the third century. Traitaunas may therefore be interpreted as "the great son of Tritas". The name was borrowed from Parthian into Classical Armenian as Hrudēn.

In Zoroastrian literature
In the Avestā, Thraetaona is the son of Aθβiya, and so is called Āθβiyāni, meaning "from the family of Aθβiya". He was recorded as the killer of the dragon Zahhak (Aži Dahāk).

On the contrary, in Middle Persian texts, Dahāka/Dahāg was instead imprisoned on Mount Damavand in Amol.

In the Shahnameh
According to Ferdowsi's Shahnameh, Fereydun was the son of Ābtin, one of the descendants of Jamšid. Fereydun, together with Kāve, revolted against the tyrannical king, Zahāk, defeated and arrested him in the Alborz Mountains. Afterwards, Fereydun became the king, married Arnavāz and, according to the myth, ruled the country for about 500 years. At the end of his life, he allocated his kingdom to his three sons, Salm, Tur, and Iraj.

Iraj was Fereydun's youngest and favored son, and inherited the best part of the kingdom, namely Iran. Salm inherited Anatolia ("Rûm", more generally meaning the Roman Empire, the Greco-Roman world, or just "the West"), and Tur inherited Central Asia ("Turān", all the lands north and east of the Amu Darya, as far as China), respectively. This aroused Iraj's brothers' envy, and encouraged them to murder him. After the murder of Iraj, Fereydun enthroned Iraj's grandson, Manučehr. Manučehr's attempt to avenge his grandfather's murder initiated the Iranian-Turanian wars.

See also
 Iranian literature
 Persian mythology
 Triton (mythology)

References

Sources

External links
Stuart Cary Welch A king's book of kings: the Shah-nameh of Shah Tahmasp, 1972, Metropolitan Museum of Art (New York, N.Y.), catalog from an exhibition May 4-July 4, 1972 (open access), 201 pp, 49MB, contains material on 'Faridun' PDF pages 104, 112, 116, 120, 124
 First Iranian Legendary Heroes and Heroines: A Research Note by Manouchehr Saadat Noury

Longevity myths
Mythological kings
Pishdadian dynasty
Cyrus the Great